Claytonia (spring beauty) is a genus of flowering plants native to Asia, North America, and Central America. The vitamin-rich leaves can be eaten raw or cooked, and the tubers can be prepared like potatoes.

Description
The plants are somewhat fleshy and only a few centimeters in height.

Taxonomy

The genus was formerly included in the purslane family (Portulacaceae), but with the adoption of the APG IV system, in 2009 it was moved to the family Montiaceae. A number of the species were formerly treated in the related genus Montia. A comprehensive scientific study of Claytonia was published in 2006.

Species
, Kew's Plants of the World Online lists 33 accepted species:

Etymology
The genus is named after John Clayton, who collected specimens of various plants in North America and distributed them to botanists in Europe.

Distribution and habitat
The genus is primarily native to the mountain chains of Asia and North America. In the Old World, it is distributed northwest to Kazakhstan, Mongolia, and eastern Russia. It is found in most of the northern United States, with some species located in Guatemala.

Claytonia perfoliata, the species for which the term miner's lettuce was coined, is distributed throughout the Mountain West of North America in moist soils and prefers areas that have been recently disturbed.

Uses
The leaves of the spring beauty are rich in vitamins and can be eaten raw or cooked. The roots are in the form of tubers which can be cooked and eaten like potatoes.

References

External links
 CalFlora Database: Claytonia
Illinois Wildflowers. Flower-Visiting Insects of Spring Beauty

 
Caryophyllales genera
Taxa named by Carl Linnaeus